Burstall may refer to:

Places
Burstall, Saskatchewan, Canada
Burstall, Suffolk, England

Other uses
Burstall (surname)

See also
Birstall (disambiguation)